Senno Salzwedel (born 24 August 1959) is a retired German weightlifter. He won silver medals at the world and European championships in 1981, as well as three bronze medals at the European championships of 1984–1986. At the 1985 World Weightlifting Championships he placed first in the clean and jerk, but finished outside the podium overall.

References

1959 births
Living people
German male weightlifters
European Weightlifting Championships medalists
World Weightlifting Championships medalists
People from Waren (Müritz)
Sportspeople from Mecklenburg-Western Pomerania